Kasenyi is a location in Kasese District, in the Western Region of Uganda.

Location
Kasenyi is in Kasese District of the Rwenzururu sub-region. It lies within Queen Elizabeth National Park, the most visited of Uganda's national parks. This is on the western shores of Lake George, close to the point where the Kazinga Channel joins the lake.

Overview
Kasenyi is in the northeastern sector of Queen Elizabeth National Park. This sector is also referred to as the Mweya - Kasenyi Sector in contrast to the Ishasha Sector in the southwestern part of the park. The area around Kasenyi is open savannah, where Uganda Kob are the dominant mammals. Lions are frequently seen here on game drives.

Points of interest
The following additional points of interest lie inside or near Kasenyi:
 Kasenyi Airport, a civilian airport located at Kasenyi
 Kazinga Channel, a fresh waterway connecting Lake George and Lake Edward,  to the southwest of Kasenyi.
 Lake George, a freshwater lake in the Western Rift Valley and entirely within Queen Elizabeth National Park

References

Populated places in Western Region, Uganda
Kasese District